The following is a list of awards and nominations received by Steve McQueen.

McQueen is British film director, producer, screenwriter, and video artist. He is most known for the films, Hunger about the 1981 Irish hunger strike, Shame a drama about sex addiction, 12 Years a Slave (2013) based on the 1853 memoir of the same name, and the heist drama Widows (2018). For his work on the 2008 film Hunger, he won a BAFTA Award for Outstanding Debut by a British Writer, Director or Producer, and he won an Academy Award, BAFTA Award and a Golden Globe for Best Film for his work on the 2013 film 12 Years a Slave.

Major awards

Academy Awards

Golden Globe Awards

British Academy Film Awards

British Independent Film Awards

Independent Spirit Awards

Miscellaneous awards

Black Reel Awards

European Film Award

Evening Standard British Film Awards

NAACP Image Awards

Satellite Awards

Film critic awards

Film festival awards

Miscelleanous awards

References

Lists of awards received by film director
Lists of awards received by writer